Hit U is the fourth Korean extended play by South Korean girl group Dal Shabet, released January 27, 2012. The album was promoted through their title track "Hit U". It was their first release to hit number 1 on the Gaon Albums Chart, and their most successful release to date. It was the last promotion cycle with member Viki before her departure.

Release and promotion
The official music video of "Hit U" was released on January 26, 2012. Promotions for "Hit U" began the same day on M! Countdown. The mini-album was released the next day.

Track listing

Chart performance

Sales

References

2012 EPs
Dance-pop EPs
Korean-language EPs
Dal Shabet albums